Interferon-alpha/beta receptor beta chain is a protein that in humans is encoded by the IFNAR2 gene.

Function 

The protein encoded by this gene is a type I membrane protein that forms one of the two chains of a receptor for interferons alpha and beta. Binding and activation of the receptor stimulates Janus protein kinases, which in turn phosphorylate several proteins, including STAT1 and STAT2. Multiple transcript variants encoding at least two different isoforms have been found for this gene.

Interactions 

IFNAR2 has been shown to interact with:
 GNB2L1, 
 IFNA2,
 STAT1,  and
 STAT2.

References

Further reading